Filthy primarily refers to dirt. It may also refer to:

Music

Albums
Filthy!, a 1972 album by Papa John Creach
Filthy (album), a 1988 album by The Egyptian Lover, or the title song

Songs
Filthy, a 2013 EP by The Bug
"Filthy" (song), a 2018 Justin Timberlake song
"Filthy", a 1995 charting double A-side with "Only Love Can Break Your Heart" 1990, covered as single "Jungle Pulse" by Étienne Daho

Other
Filthy, another nickname of Dirty John (John Meehan)
Filthy (film), a 2017 film by Tereza Nvotová

See also
Filth (disambiguation)